Aderklaa is a town in the district of Gänserndorf in Lower Austria in Austria.

Geography
Aderklaa lies in the Marchfeld in Lower Austria between Vienna and Deutsch Wagram. About 1.22 percent of the municipality is forested.

References

Cities and towns in Gänserndorf District